Kabindra Purkayastha (born 15 December 1931) is a former union minister of state of India. He served as minister of state for communication in Atal Bihari Vajpayee government from 1998 to 1999. He is a senior leader of Bharatiya Janata Party in Assam, India.

He was born in 1931 in Kamarkhal in Sylhet district now in Bangladesh and studied M.A. at Gauhati University.

He was first elected to Lok Sabha in 1991 from Silchar constituency in Assam. He was re-elected to the Lok Sabha in 1998 from same constituency. In 2009, he was elected to the 15th Lok Sabha, defeating heavyweight candidates Santosh Mohan Dev of INC and Badruddin Ajmal of AUDF from Silchar. But in 2014 LS-election, he has been defeated by Sushmita Dev (INC), daughter of Santosh Mohan Dev, despite the Modi-wave in his favour.

Notes

External links 

People from Cachar district
India MPs 2009–2014
1931 births
Living people
India MPs 1991–1996
India MPs 1998–1999
Lok Sabha members from Assam
National Democratic Alliance candidates in the 2014 Indian general election
Bharatiya Janata Party politicians from Assam